Ortiz is a Spanish-language surname.

Ortiz may also refer to:

 Ortiz, Guárico, town in Guárico State, Venezuela
 Ortiz Municipality, a municipality in Guárico State, Venezuela
 Ortiz, Colorado, a small village in the San Luis Valley near Alamosa
 Ortiz Island, Antarctica